Great Keppel Island (Woppaburra, Wop-Pa, Wapparaburra) lies  from the coast off Yeppoon in the Shire of Livingstone, Queensland, Australia. It is part of the Capricorn Coast of Central Queensland. The island's traditional owners are the Woppaburra people. As the largest of the eighteen islands in the Keppel Group, Wop-Pa covers an area of 1308 hectares. It is within the local government area of Shire of Livingstone (between 2008 and 2013, it was within the Rockhampton Region).

The tropical climate and numerous beaches attract tourists from all points, and a number of accommodation villages and houses cater for tourists including  Air BnB Houses. There are 17 white sandy beaches with some of the highest cover of hard coral reefs on the Great Barrier Reef. The coral diversity of these reefs matches that of the Whitsundays with clear waters most of the year around.

Transport
The island is served by ferries and aircraft landing at Grand Keppel Airport. At one point major airlines served the island, mostly with smaller Twin Otter aircraft suited to the short runway. However, since the closure of the resort, the small private airport is not attended and 24 hours advanced approval is required to land.

History
The islands were named by Captain James Cook in April 1770 after the then First Lord of the Admiralty, Admiral Augustus Keppel.

Prior to European settlement, the island was home to an estimated 60-80 Woppaburra and Ganumi people of the Darumbal nation, with centuries old middens testifying to the quantity of seafood found in the surrounding waters. It is believed that they occupied Wop-pa for around 5,000 years. European settlers killed or removed most of the indigenous population by the end of the 19th century. The first recorded visit to the island was conducted by naturalist John MacGillivray aboard HMS Rattlesnake in 1847.

In 1866, Robert Ross obtained a lease over Great Keppel "from year to year and not exceeding five years" in partnership with C.E Beddome and Sir Arthur Palmer (Rowland, 2007) and so began the pastoral era on the islands. In 1882 the lease on Great Keppel Island drew interest and competition.  Shaddock (1981) describes how the Lands Department held a public auction for six square miles with the successful applicant being Robert Lyons of Rockhampton. In its early European history, the island was used to raise sheep. William T Wyndham, became the first permanent European inhabitant on Great Keppel, having been appointed by Lyons as stock-keeper. Wyndham developed good relationships with the Woppaburra and was just in his treatment of them. Wyndham has both the highest peak on the island and a cove on the east coast named in his honour. Wyndham left the island after witnessing the mistreatment of the Woppaburra people by the lessee who forcibly removed 30 people following the killing of some sheep. The remaining people were forced to work for the lessee in squalid conditions and over the next 20 years their numbers dwindled until the final forced removed of the last 18 Woppaburra people in 1902.

The island was effectively vacant from 1903 to 1918. At that point, Michael and Lizzie O'Neill took over the grazing lease and ran sheep, also building a new homestead in the central part of the island. Michael O'Neill died in 1923 but Lizzie remained on the island, remarrying a young fisherman, Ralph Leeke in 1924. The homestead is now known as Leeke's Homestead and is listed on the Queensland Heritage Register. Leeke's Beach and Estuary are also named after Ralph and Lizzie.  The marriage did not last and Ralph left the island but Lizzie remained running the sheep by herself until the early 1940s.

After World War II, the island increasingly became a tourist destination.. Prior to this a local oysterman, James Morris was in the habit of bringing fishing parties to this island with accommodation in bush shelters. The first two huts were built by his sons Con and Cres in 1935 at Fisherman's Beach. In 1957, Charles Tompson finished constructing a house and seven cabins at Fisherman's Beach and so began the first rudimentary 'resort'. Ill health saw Tompson sell the buildings to Con, Cres and Alan Morris who called the resort 'Silver Sands' and ran it until 1966. It was then purchased by Graham Roberts and Tom Green who built a large new building and the first swimming pool. This was also when Trans Australia Airlines (TAA) built the airstrip to service the resort. Roberts and Green sold to a Sydney-based consortium in 1971 which also acquired the grazing lease thus changing the future use of the island. TAA increased its interests in the resort taking over full ownership in 1975. The resort continued to expand over the next 15 years eventually reaching a size able to accommodate 350 visitors and 130 staff. It is most famously known for the highly successful "Get Wrecked on Great Keppel" advertising campaign.

Qantas took over TAA and the resort in 1992 but sold it to two Queensland businessmen, Bevan Whittaker and Ron Hancock in 1998. Under this ownership it was operated firstly by Contiki and then by Mercure. A further sale followed in 2006 with Sydney-based developer Tower Holdings taking ownership. Tower only ran the resort for a short time before closing it down in February 2008 announcing its plans for a major redevelopment involving a large hotel, hundreds of apartments and condominiums, a marina, a Greg Norman designed golf course and a larger sized airstrip capable of landing small jet aircraft.

After 12 years of ownership the only major accomplishment by Tower Holdings was the completion of an Environmental Impact Study which lead to the approval by all three levels of government for the redevelopment proposal. Tower Holdings demolished a number of the old resort buildings in April 2018 and then put the remains of the resort and its leases on the market in the middle of the year.

Heritage listings
Great Keppel Island has a number of heritage-listed sites, including:
 Leeke Homestead

Resorts

The first resort on the island was operating in 1967. There are no high-rise resorts on the island.
The resort is now closed however there is still accommodation on Great Keppel Island which ranges from tents and cabins or even a private beach house on the water's edge.

Ferries depart everyday to Great Keppel Island from Keppel Bay Marina & Pier One, Rosslyn Bay. A number of charters, and full day cruises, sailing adventures, and extended tour options are also available from Keppel Bay Marina.

From April 2002,Great Keppel Island boasted a resort owned by Contiki, dedicated to making it a "backpackers' island", though has recently been taken over by Mercure Resort, making it more of a family resort.

After purchasing the lease for the resort and that of Lot 21 which covers 74% of the island, GKI Resort Pty Ltd, a subsidiary of the privately owned Australian company Tower Holdings, closed the facility in 2008. They then unveiled a $1.15 billion revitalisation plan for the island. The plan, which has been declared a "significant project" by the Queensland Government, includes a 300-room resort hotel, 300 resort apartments, 1,700 villas, a 560-berth marina and ferry terminal, a championship golf course, yacht club, sporting ovals, childcare facilities, chapel and cultural centre. The plan includes 1,300 acres (545 hectares) of environmental parkland on Lot 21 which is currently public land for recreation purposes. This land has already been recommended for a conservation park by the Department of Environment and Resource Management. Tower chairman Terry Agnew did not have the support of the residents of Central Queensland or the Environment Department. The proposal was rejected by the Federal Environment Minister Peter Garrett in October 2009 on the grounds that there would be 'unacceptable' impacts to the World Heritage Great Barrier Reef values of the island. Unfazed by the objections and in spite of several other Great Barrier Reef Island resorts closing

Tower Holdings submitted a third proposal early in 2010. The federal Tourism Minister, Martin Ferguson, announced his support for Agnew's proposal on 22 February 2012.

Whilst Contiki managed the resort it was widely visited by high-school students during the school holidays. The most popular souvenir, mainly purchased by girls, is a T-shirt proclaiming "I got wrecked on Keppel Island".

Environment

Great Keppel Island is part of the Great Barrier Reef Marine Park. The island is known for its fish diversity.

Swamp mahogany, a species with a limited topographical range, grows on the island.

See also

 List of islands of Australia

References

External links

Islands of Queensland
Islands of the Coral Sea
Shire of Livingstone